Eleanore Myers Jewett was an American author born in New York City in 1890. She attended Barnard College as a comparative literature major and became interested in the medieval period. Her book The Hidden Treasure of Glaston was awarded the Newbery Honor Medal in 1947.

References

External links

 
 

1890 births
Newbery Honor winners
Year of death missing
Barnard College alumni